The Governor John Walter Smith House is a historic home located at Snow Hill, Worcester County, Maryland.   It is an unusually large and elaborate example of the Queen Anne style of domestic architecture. It was built in 1889-90 for local landowner John Walter Smith, who was later a United States representative,  Governor of Maryland and United States Senator. The house retains its interior millwork and unusual Art Nouveau stained glass windows.

It was listed on the National Register of Historic Places in 1994.

References

Houses in Worcester County, Maryland
Houses on the National Register of Historic Places in Maryland
Queen Anne architecture in Maryland
Houses completed in 1890
Art Nouveau architecture in the United States
Art Nouveau houses
National Register of Historic Places in Worcester County, Maryland
Governor of Maryland